Edwin Mushoriwa is the member for the Dzivarasekwa parliamentary constituency of Zimbabwe, primarily located in the western part of Harare. He is from the Movement for Democratic Change – Tsvangirai.

See also
Politics of Zimbabwe

References

Year of birth missing (living people)
Place of birth missing (living people)
Living people
21st-century Zimbabwean politicians
Members of the National Assembly of Zimbabwe
Movement for Democratic Change – Tsvangirai politicians
People from Harare
Zimbabwean politicians